This is a list of African-American newspapers that have been published in Louisiana.  It includes both current and historical newspapers.

The first African-American newspaper in Louisiana was L'Union, a French-language newspaper launched in 1862.  The first daily African-American newspaper in Louisiana, and in the entire country, came two years later with La Tribune de la Nouvelle-Orléans. 

Notably, although the Louisiana Creole people were not considered Black until after the Civil War, the history of African-American newspapers in Louisiana is sometimes considered to begin with the New Orleans Daily Creole, a Creole pro-slavery newspaper launched in 1856. However, scholars of the African-American press generally exclude the Daily Creole. 

Although L'Union was the first African-American newspaper in Louisiana, it was not the state's first African-American periodical: starting in 1843 a successful African American literary magazine was published in New Orleans, titled L'Album Litteraire, Journal des Jeunes Gens.  

Many African-American newspapers are published in Louisiana today; they are highlighted in green in the list below.  The oldest such newspaper still in publication is The Shreveport Sun, established in 1920.

Newspapers

See also 
List of African-American newspapers and media outlets
List of African-American newspapers in Arkansas
List of African-American newspapers in Mississippi
List of African-American newspapers in Texas
List of newspapers in Louisiana

Works cited

References 

Newspapers
Louisiana
African-American
African-American newspapers